Anatoly Vyborny (born 8 June 1965, Shepetivka) is a Russian political figure and a deputy of the 6th, 7th, and 8th State Dumas.
 
From 1988 to 1991, he served at the Soviet Armed Forces. From 1991 to 2003, Vyborny worked at the Military Prosecutor's Office of the Russian Federation. From 2003 to 2010, he was the Chief Adviser of the Department for Cooperation with Law Enforcement Agencies of The Office of the Plenipotentiary Representative of the President of the Russian Federation in the Central Federal District. On December 4, 2011, he was elected deputy of the 6th State Duma. In 2016, he was re-elected for the 7th State Duma. Since September 2021, he has served as deputy of the 8th State Duma.

References
 

 

1965 births
Living people
United Russia politicians
21st-century Russian politicians
Eighth convocation members of the State Duma (Russian Federation)
Seventh convocation members of the State Duma (Russian Federation)
Sixth convocation members of the State Duma (Russian Federation)